Gateway Conference may refer to:

 Gateway Conference (1962–1975), NAIA-affiliated conference from 1962 to 1975
 Gateway Collegiate Athletic Conference, a women's-only NCAA Division I conference from 1982 to 1992
 Missouri Valley Football Conference, an NCAA Division I Football Championship Subdivision (FCS) conference, known as the Gateway Football Conference from 1992 to 2008
 Gateway Church Conference, an annual gathering of evangelical pastors held by Gateway Church in Southlake, Texas, near Dallas